The 1963 Senior League World Series took place from August 15–17 in Bethlehem, Pennsylvania, United States. Monterrey, Mexico defeated Downey, California in the championship game. This was the only edition held in Bethlehem.

This was the first SLWS to feature an international squad.

Teams

Results

References

Senior League World Series
Senior League World Series
Baseball in Pennsylvania